The John and Elsie Parsons House, located in Forest Grove, Oregon, is a house listed on the National Register of Historic Places.

See also
 National Register of Historic Places listings in Washington County, Oregon

References

Buildings and structures in Forest Grove, Oregon
Houses in Washington County, Oregon
Houses on the National Register of Historic Places in Oregon
National Register of Historic Places in Washington County, Oregon